Diego Gabriel Valdez Samudio (born 14 November 1993), better known as Mudo Valdez (Spanish, the mute), is a Paraguayan professional footballer who plays as a midfielder for Club Guaraní.

Professional career
Valdez spent his early career in the lower leagues of Paraguay with Rubio Ñu, Herreros Bueno, and Deportivo Capiatá before moving to Sportivo San Lorenzo in 2016. He made his professional debut with Sportivo San Lorenzo in a 1-0 Paraguayan Primera División win over Club River Plate on 22 January 2019.

International career
Valdez made his debut for the Paraguay national football team in a friendly 1–0 loss to Peru on 22 March 2019.

Personal life
Valdez received the nickname "El Mudo" (Spanish for mute) from his coach, Xavi Roura, for how quiet Valdez was.

References

External links
 
 

1993 births
Living people
Paraguayan footballers
Paraguay international footballers
Paraguayan expatriate footballers
Paraguayan Primera División players
Liga MX players
Club Sportivo San Lorenzo footballers
Atlético San Luis footballers
Club Sol de América footballers
Expatriate footballers in Mexico
Paraguayan expatriate sportspeople in Mexico
Association football midfielders